Sylhet, located in north-east Bangladesh, is the divisional capital and one of the four districts in the Sylhet Division.

History

Sylhet district was established on 3 January 1782, and until 1878 it was part of Bengal Province under Dhaka Division. However, in that year, Sylhet was moved to the newly created Assam Province, and it remained as part of Assam up to 1947 (except during the administrative reorganisation of Bengal Province between 1905 and 1912). Sylhet district was divided into five subdivisions and the current Sylhet District was known as the North Sylhet subdivision. In 1947, Sylhet became a part of East Pakistan as a result of a referendum (except 3 thanas of Karimganj subdivision) as part of Chittagong Division. It was subdivided into four districts in 1983–84 with the current Sylhet District being known as North Sylhet. It became a part of Sylhet Division after its formation in 1995. Sylhet has played a vital role in the Bangladeshi economy. Several of Bangladesh's finance ministers have been Members of Parliament from the city of Sylhet.

Demographics 

According to the 2022 Bangladesh census, Sylhet District had a population of 3,897,037, of which 1,894,232 were males, 1,959,054 were females and 284 were third genders. Rural population was 2,841,992 (78.1%) while the urban population was 1,011,578 (21.9%). Sylhet district had a literacy rate of 76.26% for the population 7 years and above: 78.32% for males and 74.29 % for females.

Muslims make up 92.52% of the population while Hindus are 7.32% of the population. Ethnic population is 12,781, mainly Khasi.

Administration
Sylhet District is divided into thirteen upazilas.

The upazilas are:
 Balaganj
 Beanibazar
 Bishwanath
 Companiganj
 Dakshin Surma
 Fenchuganj 
 Golapganj
 Gowainghat
 Jaintiapur
 Kanaighat
 Osmani Nagar
 Sylhet Sadar
 Zakiganj

Notable people
 M.A.G. Osmani Commander-in-Chief of the Mukti Bahini during the Liberation War.
 Md. Saifur Rahman Former Finance and Planning Minister
 Shah Jalal, Sufi saint and mystic.
 Shah Paran, Sufi saint.
 Shah Abdul Karim, Baul folk singer, composer.
 Swami Nikhilananda, Ramakrishna Math and Mission Order monk and Founder-Minister, Ramakrishna-Vivekananda Center, New York City 1933-1973
 Swami Gambhirananda, Ramakrish Math and Mission Order monk and President of the Order 1985-1988
 Nurul Islam Nahid, Former Education Minister of Bangladesh
 Govinda Chandra Dev (1 February 1907 – 26 March 1971), known as G. C. Dev, was a professor of philosophy at the University of Dhaka. He was assassinated at the onset of Bangladesh Liberation War of 1971 by the Pakistan Army.
 Dr Abdul Malik, National Professor, Brigadier (rtd.), Cardiologist, Founder and President of National Heart Foundation of Bangladesh.
 Rushanara Ali, first Bangladeshi to be elected as an MP for the British parliament.
 Ajmal Masroor, television presenter, politician and imam, Parliamentary candidate for a UK Parliament constituency.
 Lutfur Rahman, the first elected mayor of the London Borough of Tower Hamlets council.
 Mukhlesur Rahman Chowdhury, former minister and adviser to the president of Bangladesh.
 Humayun Rashid Choudhury, diplomat, UN General Assembly President, Awami League leader and former speaker of National parliament.
 Dilwar Khan, poet.
 Salman Shah, film actor, model.
 Shuvro Dev, playback singer.
 Syed Ahmed, businessman, British TV personality.
 Badar Uddin Ahmed Kamran, Mayor of Sylhet City Corporation (2003-13).
 Enam Ali, restauranteur and founder of the British Curry Awards.

See also
Chowkideki
Districts of Bangladesh
List of colleges in Sylhet
List of people from Sylhet

Notes

References

External links

 
Districts of Bangladesh
Districts of Bangladesh established before 1971
1782 establishments in India
1782 establishments in the British Empire